Can-linn is an Irish music group that represented their country at the Eurovision Song Contest 2014 in Copenhagen, Denmark along with singer Kasey Smith. "Can-linn" is derived from the Irish Can linn, "Sing with us", and consists of Denice Doyle (violin), Jenni Bowden (vocals), Donna Bissett (vocals) as well as the dancers Tarik Shebani and Thomas Spratt.
They performed 9th in the second semi-final on 8 May and failed to qualify for the grand final.

Discography

Singles

References

Eurovision Song Contest entrants of 2014
Eurovision Song Contest entrants for Ireland
Irish folk musical groups